Camp Enari (also known as Dragon Mountain Base Camp and Hensel Airfield) is a former U.S. Army base east of Pleiku in the Central Highlands of South Vietnam.

History
Camp Enari was established near Dragon Mountain (Núi Hàm Rồng) and Highway 19, 12 km southeast of Pleiku. The base was named for 1st Lieutenant Mark Enari, the first 4th Infantry Division member awarded the Silver Star (posthumously) in Vietnam, who was killed in action on 2 December 1966.

Camp Enari served as the base for the 4th Infantry Division from September 1966 until February 1968 and from April 1968 until February 1970.

Other units stationed at Camp Enari included:
2nd Squadron, 1st Cavalry (August 1967-February 1968, June-November 1968)
69th Armor Regiment (August 1967-April 1970)
4th Aviation Battalion

Hensel Airfield was named after WO-1 Ernest Hensel a 1st Squadron, 10th Cavalry Huey helicopter gunship pilot who was killed in action on 17 February 1967.

The base was turned over to South Vietnamese control on 15 April 1970.

Current use
The base is abandoned and turned over to farmland, light industry and housing.

References

Installations of the United States Army in South Vietnam
Buildings and structures in Gia Lai province